Murray Flegel (born February 13, 1948) is a former ice hockey defenceman who played 10 seasons of professional hockey from 1967 to 1977.

Flegel played professionally in the American Hockey League with the Cleveland Barons, Montreal Voyageurs, Baltimore Clippers, Nova Scotia Voyageurs, and Springfield Indians.

During the 1976–77 season Flegel was the player-coach of the Kimberley Dynamiters in the WIHL.

Awards
The IHL twice awarded Flegel the Governor's Trophy as the league's most outstanding defenceman during the 1974–75 and 1975–76 seasons when he was a member of the Muskegon Mohawks.

References

External links

1948 births
Baltimore Clippers players
Canadian expatriate ice hockey players in the United States
Canadian ice hockey defencemen
Cleveland Barons (1937–1973) players
Houston Apollos players
Ice hockey people from Saskatchewan
Kansas City Blues players
Kimberley Dynamiters players
Living people
Montreal Voyageurs players
Muskegon Mohawks players
Nova Scotia Voyageurs players
Omaha Knights (CHL) players
Regina Pats players
Salt Lake Golden Eagles (WHL) players
Seattle Totems (WHL) players
Sportspeople from Moose Jaw
Springfield Indians players